Mike Glover may refer to:

 Mike Glover (engineer), British engineer
 Mike Glover (basketball) (born 1987), American basketball player
 Mike Glover (boxer) (1890–1917), American boxer

See also
 Michael Glover (disambiguation)